Mahjong is a 1996 Taiwanese comedy film written and directed by Edward Yang.  The film stars Chang Chen, Nick Erickson and Virginie Ledoyen. The film was entered into the 46th Berlin International Film Festival where it won an Honourable Mention.

Cast
 as Red Fish
Chang Chen as Hong Kong
Lawrence Ko as Lun-lun
Virginie Ledoyen as Marthe
Wu Nien-jen as the Older Mobster
Elaine Jin as Chen's Wife
Carrie Ng as Angela
Chang Kuo-chu as Winston Chen
Nick Erickson as Markus

References

External links

1996 films
1996 comedy films
1990s English-language films
1990s Mandarin-language films
Films directed by Edward Yang
Taiwanese comedy films